Ethan J. Blackadder (born 22 March 1995) is a New Zealand rugby union player who plays for  in the Bunnings NPC and the  in the Super Rugby competition. His position of choice is flanker. He is the son of former All Blacks player Todd Blackadder.

Early career 
Blackadder played his club rugby for the Nelson Rugby Club. He was educated at Nelson College from 2008 to 2012.

Tasman 
He was part of the Tasman team that won the Mitre 10 Cup for the first time in 2019. Blackadder missed the 2020 Mitre 10 Cup with injury as the Mako went on to win their second premiership title in a row.

Crusaders 
Blackadder was named in the  squad for the 2018 Super Rugby season. After an outstanding season Blackadder was voted Champion Crusader of the Year by his teammates at the 2021 Crusaders awards.

All Blacks 
After an outstanding 2021 Super Rugby season Blackadder was named in the All Blacks squad to play Tonga and Fiji in the July Steinlager Series. He made his debut against Tonga at Mount Smart Stadium, coming off the bench in a 102–0 win for the All Blacks – becoming All Black number 1195. He was named in the travelling squad for the 2021 Rugby Championship and the end of year tour of Europe.

References

External links
 

1995 births
Living people
Crusaders (rugby union) players
New Zealand international rugby union players
New Zealand rugby union players
People educated at Nelson College
Rugby union flankers
Rugby union number eights
Rugby union players from Rangiora
Tasman rugby union players